Taveuni is an island.

Taveuni may also refer to:

Taveuni (volcano)
Taveuni District